Santosh S. Lad (born 27 February 1975 in Sandur, India) is an Indian Congress politician (who represents Indian National Congress). He is a former  Minister of Karnataka State for Information and Infrastructure. He was elected as MLA (Member of Legislative Assembly) from Kalagatagi constituency in the Dharwad district of Karnataka state.

Early life
Santosh Lad, son of Shivaji Lad and Shailaja Lad was born on 27 February 1975 in Sandur taluk of Bellary district. He has one elder sister. He completed his B.Com. from Sandur Education Society's Arts, Science & Commerce College, Bellary, Karnataka. His family was affluent because of their involvement in the mining industry since the 1950s. Santosh was an active member of the sports community and actively participated in local tournaments and state-level competitions. He participated in U-21 Cricket state-level tournament KSCA representing Tumkur Zone as a team member and as captain.

Personal life
Lad's father, Shivaji Lad, died when Santosh was 16 years old. He is married to Keerthi Lad; they have a son.

Political career
Lad started his political career as a counsellor from Sandur taluk. He had very little success in Taluka panchayat elections, where he lost marginally in his first election. He went on to win both seats he contested in the following election, contributing to his party gaining the majority during that period.

Lad contested the MLA election against a strong contender from the Congress Party. He represented the Janata Dal (Secular) party and was the youngest MLA (age 29), along with the first person from his party to win Sandur constituency; the election was won with a record margin. Lad was part of the government formation under H. D. Kumaraswamy, ex-chief minister of the Karnataka state.

In the 2008 Karnataka Assembly elections, he won the Kalghatgi constituency in the Dharwad district. He currently is an active member and represents Indian National Congress. In the 2013 Karnataka state assembly election, Santosh Lad won with a margin of over 45,000 votes, to win consecutively for the second time from Kalghatgi and third time overall. Congress secured an absolute majority to form the government. Santosh Lad was appointed Minister of State for Information and Infrastructure. In 2018, legislative elections, he lost to C.M. Nimbannanavar of the BJP, with a margin of 20,997 votes.

Initiatives
Santosh Lad was appointed state representative to oversee the rescue operation in the worst flooded area of Uttarakhand, accompanied by a team headed by Hemanth Nimbalkar, Kari Gowda, and Naveen Raj Singh. After over ten days of rescue operations, the team was able to rescue everyone except 14 people for whom an extensive search was carried out.

Positions held
1998 – Elected councillor, Sandur Town Panchayat
2003 – Elected MLA from Sandur representing Janata Dal (Secular)
2007 – Joined Indian National Congress
2008 – Elected MLA from Kalghatgi representing Indian National Congress
2010 – Appointed general secretary of KPCC
2010 – Appointed Raichur District in charge by KPCC
2013 – Wins second time in a row as MLA from Kalghatgi
2013 – Appointed Minister of State for Information and Infrastructure

Notes

References

 Santosh Lad Interview with Bangalore Mirror on Uttarakhand Relief Operations
 Uttarakhand relief operations -Deccan Herald
 Uttarakhand Flood relief efforts. Santosh Lad visiting the epicenter to help and support.
 State Rushes Medical Aid to Uttarakhand
 Infrastructure Development Department of Karnataka
 Department of Information for Karnataka State
 Santosh Lad oath taking ceremony- NDTV
 List of M.L.A in Karnataka.
 Santosh S Lad member of Karnataka Legislative Assembly.
 600 couples tie knot at mass marriage. Deccan Herald.
 Insurance cover for all in Kalghatagi constituency. Business Standard.
 Government is neglecting Kalghatgi, says Santosh Lad. The Hindu.
 Bollywood glitterati show up at Lad’s mass wedding. Bangalore Mirror.

1975 births
Living people
Illegal mining in India
Indian businesspeople in mining
Indian National Congress politicians from Karnataka
People from Bellary district
Karnataka MLAs 2008–2013
Businesspeople from Karnataka
Karnataka MLAs 2013–2018